Dan R. Littman is an American immunologist best known for his work on T lymphocytes. He is Professor of Molecular Immunology at New York University, an investigator of the Howard Hughes Medical Institute, and a member of the National Academy of Sciences. On October 15, 2012, he was elected as a member of the Institute of Medicine. He became a co-editor of the Annual Review of Immunology in 2013.

References

External links
 Littman Laboratory Website
 HHMI Investigator Profile

Living people
American immunologists
Washington University in St. Louis alumni
Columbia University faculty
Howard Hughes Medical Investigators
Fellows of Lincoln College, Oxford
New York University faculty
Members of the United States National Academy of Sciences
Physicians from New York City
Place of birth missing (living people)
Year of birth missing (living people)
University of California, San Francisco faculty
Scientists from New York (state)
Princeton University alumni
Fellows of the American Academy of Microbiology
Annual Reviews (publisher) editors